The Yorkshire Lawn Tennis Championships or simply known as the Yorkshire Championships was a combined men's and women's open grass court tennis tournament established in 1884 as the Yorkshire Lawn Tennis Tournament then later Yorkshire Association and County Open Tournament and ran till 1970. It was first held in Ilkley, then, Harrogate, then Whitby before moving to Scarborough, Yorkshire, England.

History
The first Yorkshire Lawn Tennis Tournament was established in 1885 and played at Ilkley, Yorkshire, England. In 1887 the event was renamed as Yorkshire Association and County Open Tournament. In 1889 the name was changed again the Yorkshire Open Championships. In 1906 the event was move permamently to Scarborough, North Yorkshire. The championships were held as part of the worldwide tennis circuit until 1970. The event is still being held as late as 2017 as the Yorkshire Tennis County Championships.

Locations
The championships have been staged in the following cities Harrogate, Hull, Ilkley, Leeds, Scarborough, Sheffield and Whitby

References

Grass court tennis tournaments
Defunct tennis tournaments in the United Kingdom